Prahlad Rawat (born 14 October 1970) is an Indian former cricketer. He played in 48 first-class and 23 List A matches between 1987 and 2001. He is now an umpire, and stood in a tour match between India A Women and England Women in April 2018.

References

External links
 

1970 births
Living people
Indian cricketers
Indian cricket umpires
Railways cricketers
Vidarbha cricketers
Place of birth missing (living people)